"Miracle" is the second solo single by American rock singer Jon Bon Jovi. It was released in 1990 from his debut album, Blaze of Glory, the soundtrack album from the film Young Guns II. The song charted at  12 on both the US Billboard Hot 100 and  Cash Box and No. 20 on the Album Rock Tracks charts.

Music video
The music video for the song features Jeff Beck on guitars and stars Matt LeBlanc in one of his earliest acting appearances.

Track listings

US and Canadian 7-inch single (878 392-7)
 "Miracle" – 5:08
 "Blood Money" – 2:34

UK CD single (878 523-2)
 "Miracle" – 5:08
 "Bang a Drum" – 4:43
 "Going Back" (live) – 4:07

UK limited-edition 12-inch picture disc (JBJP 212; 878 591-1)
 "Miracle" – 5:08
 "Dyin' Ain't Much of a Livin'" – 4:39
 "Going Back" (live) – 4:07

UK limited-edition 12-inch picture disc with poster (JBJ 212)
 "Miracle" – 5:08
 "Dyin' Ain't Much of a Livin'" – 4:39
 "8 Minute Interview with Jon Bon Jovi" – 7:40 (Interview taken from the Radio One 'Saturday Sequence' broadcast on 11th August 1990. Released by arrangement with BBC Enterprises Ltd.)

Japanese CD single (PHCR-8006)
 "Miracle" – 4:37
 "Dyin' Ain't Much of a Livin'" – 4:31
 "Going Back" (live) – 4:07
 "Miracle" (edit version) – 4:34

Charts

Weekly charts

Year-end charts

Release history

References

1990 singles
1990 songs
Jon Bon Jovi songs
Mercury Records singles
Songs written by Jon Bon Jovi
Vertigo Records singles